Lucas Nicolás Chacana (born 16 June 1993) is an Argentine professional footballer who plays as a forward.

Career
Chacana's first club were San Martín of Torneo Argentino A, he featured eighty-three times and scored thirteen goals in four seasons with the club. In January 2016, Chacana joined Argentine Primera División side Huracán. He made his professional debut on 2 February in a Copa Libertadores first round win over Caracas. After two more appearances in continental competition against Atlético Nacional and Peñarol respectively, Chacana featured for the first time in the Primera División during a 4–2 victory over Temperley on 20 March. He scored his first Huracán goal in the league on 16 December against Talleres.

On 30 August 2017, Chacana was signed by fellow Primera División team Tigre. After just one start in three appearances, Chacana departed Tigre in January 2018 to sign for Atlético de Rafaela of Primera B Nacional. Five months later, Chacana joined Los Andes following only two matches for Rafaela. Ahead of 2019–20, Chacana signed with Deportivo Morón. Six appearances followed. January 2020 saw Chacana head abroad to Romania with Liga I side Politehnica Iași. He made his debut on 3 February against Viitorul Constanța, which was followed by his first goal on 27 June versus Chindia Târgoviște.

After twenty-four appearances for Politehnica Iași, Chacana agreed a transfer to Romania's Liga II with Universitatea Cluj on 11 January 2021.

Career statistics
.

References

External links

1993 births
Living people
Sportspeople from San Miguel de Tucumán
Argentine footballers
Association football forwards
Argentine expatriate footballers
Expatriate footballers in Romania
Argentine expatriate sportspeople in Romania
Torneo Argentino A players
Torneo Federal A players
Argentine Primera División players
Primera Nacional players
Liga I players
San Martín de Tucumán footballers
Club Atlético Huracán footballers
Club Atlético Tigre footballers
Atlético de Rafaela footballers
Club Atlético Los Andes footballers
Deportivo Morón footballers
FC Politehnica Iași (2010)
Liga II players
FC Universitatea Cluj players